Aleksandr Ilich Rudakov (1817–1875) was a Russian naval officer and chief manager of the Russian-American Company.

Rudakov was trained as Sea Cadet Corps. Throughout the 1830s he toured in the Baltic, Black and the Mediterranean Seas, participating in operations against Imam Shamil. Rudakov eventually was promoted to Vice-Admiral, on 1 January 1865 and retired five years later.

References

Governors of the Russian-American Company
19th-century people from the Russian Empire
1817 births
1875 deaths
Imperial Russian Navy personnel
Place of birth missing
Naval Cadet Corps alumni